The Omission is a 2018 Argentine drama film directed by Sebastián Schjaer. It was screened in the Panorama section at the 68th Berlin International Film Festival.

Cast
 Sofía Brito as Paula
 Malena Hernández Díaz as Malena
 Laura López Moyano as Laura
 Victoria Raposo as Pilar

References

External links
 

2018 films
2018 drama films
Argentine drama films
2010s Spanish-language films
2010s Argentine films